Alexander Francis Henry von Tunzelmann (15 June 1877 – 19 September 1957), a New Zealand crew member of the Norwegian whaling ship Antarctic was part of the first group known with certainty to have set foot on the mainland of Antarctica—at Cape Adare on 24 January 1895.  It is possible that the Anglo-American sealer John Davis achieved this feat 74 years earlier, on 7 February 1821, but his journal entry is open to interpretation.

Family background
Alexander's ancestors were the von Tunzelmann family who migrated from Prussia to Estonia where they were members of the Baltic German Ritterschaft or nobility. Two brothers and a sister from the family settled in New Zealand.

He was born in Nelson, and died in Invercargill. He had five children: Ronald, Isobel, John, Francis and Gilbert. His father was Johannes Emanuel von Tunzelmann, later commonly known as John (1839–1898), a younger brother to Nicholas von Tunzelmann (1828–1900).

Circumstances of the landing
The voyage of the whaling ship Antarctic, captained by Leonard Kristensen and financed by Henrik Johan Bull, put a boat ashore on 24 January 1895 in the vicinity of Cape Adare, at the northern extremity of the Victoria Land. The boat held six men, including Kristensen, Bull, Carsten Borchgrevink and the 17-year-old New Zealander Alexander von Tunzelmann. All of them apparently set foot on land within moments of each other, so credit is sometimes given, or claimed for each.

Recognition
In 1984, the place von Tunzelmann landed was officially named Von Tunzelmann Point by the New Zealand Antarctic Place Names Committee.

See also
 Carsten Borchgrevink
 Henryk Bull
 John Davis (sealer)
 Victoria Land

References

1877 births
1957 deaths
Explorers of Antarctica
New Zealand people of German descent
New Zealand sailors
People from Nelson, New Zealand